Categorical may refer to:

 Categorical imperative, a concept in philosophy developed by Immanuel Kant
 Categorical theory, in mathematical logic
 Morley's categoricity theorem, a mathematical theorem in model theory
 Categorical data analysis
 Categorical distribution, a probability distribution
 Categorical logic, a branch of category theory within mathematics with notable connections to theoretical computer science
 Categorical syllogism, a kind of logical argument
 Categorical proposition, a part of deductive reasoning
 Categorization
 Categorical perception
 Category theory in mathematics
 Categorical set theory
 Recursive categorical syntax in linguistics

See also
Category (disambiguation)